Arnage railway station was a railway station in Arnage, Aberdeenshire.

History
The station was opened on 18 July 1861 by the Formartine and Buchan Railway. On the northbound platform was the station building and on the west side was the goods yard. Two signal boxes opened in 1890: north and south. The north signal box was on the north side of the northbound platform and the south signal box was on the west side of the goods yard. The north box was downgraded to a ground frame in 1902 and control passed to the south box. The station closed on 4 October 1965. The signal boxes closed along with it. The station building is now a house.

References

 
 
 Station on navigable O.S. map

External links
RAILSCOT on Formartine and Buchan Railway

Disused railway stations in Aberdeenshire
Railway stations in Great Britain opened in 1861
Railway stations in Great Britain closed in 1965
Beeching closures in Scotland
Former Great North of Scotland Railway stations
1861 establishments in Scotland
1965 disestablishments in Scotland